Bohermore Cemetery (also known as New Cemetery) is a large cemetery located in Bohermore, an area of Galway, Ireland.

Location
The New Cemetery, as it is more popularly known in Galway, was opened in 1880. It contains two mortuary chapels, one Catholic and the other Protestant. It is one of two cemeteries operated by Galway City Council, the other being Mount St. Joseph Cemetery (also known as Rahoon Cemetery). The Commonwealth War Graves Commission cares for 17 graves from the First World War and for 3 from the Second World War. Several bodies of the passengers are buried around the memorial.

Notable burials
People buried here include:
 Pádraic Ó Conaire (1882–1928), Irish language author and journalist
 Lady Gregory (1852–1932), founding member of the Irish Literary Theatre
 William Joyce (1906–1946, known as Lord Haw-Haw), Irish-American Nazi propagandist, executed for treason
 Michael Morris, 1st Baron Killanin (1826–1901), lawyer and judge
 Michael Morris, 3rd Baron Killanin  (1914–1999), president of the International Olympic Committee
 Victims of the KLM Flight 607-E disaster (1958)

Gallery

References

External links

 Bohermore’s Victorian Cemetery - Resting Place of the Famous

Geography of Galway (city)
Cemeteries in Ireland